Chester Rural Cemetery is a historic rural cemetery founded in March 1863 in Chester, Pennsylvania. Some of the first burials were Civil War soldiers, both Union and Confederate, who died at the government hospital located at the nearby building which became the Crozer Theological Seminary.

The cemetery is landscaped and had a large lake that was drained in the 1950s.  It covers 36 acres and contains approximately 31,000 graves.  Two monuments in the cemetery have been documented by the Smithsonian Institution Research Information System: the statue "Sorrow" by Samuel Murray atop the Alfred O. Deshong memorial, and the Civil War Memorial, by Martin Milmore.

On April 13, 1917, 55 unidentified victims of the Eddystone explosion at the Eddystone Ammunition Corporation were buried in a mass grave at the Chester Rural Cemetery.  An estimated 12,000 people attended the funeral service.

Soldiers Circle
Veterans from the Civil War and other conflicts are buried in this area of the cemetery.  There are also memorials to commemorate each war since the Civil War. 

On September 17, 1873, the Soldier's Monument was dedicated to the memory of the soldiers and sailors of Delaware County who died in the Civil War.  The dedication was attended by 8,000 people. The main speaker at the dedication was the U.S. Congressman John Weiss Forney and many dignitaries attended, including Major General Galusha Pennypacker. 

On the front of the Civil War Memorial is the following inscription:

{{Quote|The people of Delaware County erected this monument to commemorate the patriotism of their citizens, soldiers and sailors who fell in defense of the Union in the War of the Rebellion 1861–1865
}}

Chester Rural Cemetery was a part of the United States National Cemetery System during the Civil War with a leased lot within the cemetery for soldiers that died in the nearby hospital. Many of the soldiers' graves, including Confederate soldiers, were moved to Philadelphia National Cemetery in Philadelphia in 1892.

Notable burials
Edward Fitzgerald Beale (1822–1893), Explorer of the West, a founder of California, hero of the US-Mexican War, US diplomat
Clarence D. Bell (1914–2002), Pennsylvania State Senator
William H. Berry (1852–1928), Pennsylvania State Treasurer and 10th Mayor of Chester 
Dorothy Chacko (1904–1992), US physician and Padma Shri awardee
Robert Chadwick (1834–1902), Pennsylvania State Representative
Joseph R. T. Coates (died 1921), Civil War Major, Mayor of Chester
Walter H. Craig (1880–1937), Pennsylvania State Representative for Delaware County from 1923 to 1925
Edward Darlington (1795–1884), US congressman
Alfred O. Deshong (1837–1913), industrialist, philanthropist and art collector
John O. Deshong (1807–1881), businessman and banker
Peter Deshong (1781–1827), businessman and banker
Samuel Edwards (1785–1850), US congressman
David Reese Esrey (1825–1898), businessman and banker
John K. Hagerty (1867–1945), Pennsylvania State Representative
John B. Hinkson (1840–1901), lawyer, businessman and sixth mayor of Chester
Mignonette Kokin aka Margaret Galetti (1880–1957), vaudeville dancer, singer and actress
John Larkin, Jr. (1804–1896), businessman, banker and first mayor of Chester
John J. McClure (1886–1965), Pennsylvania State Senator
Edward Nothnagle (1866–1938), Pennsylvania State Representative for Delaware County (1926–1936)
William G. Price, Jr. (1869–1960), businessman and Pennsylvania National Guard Officer
James William Reese (1920–1943), Medal of Honor recipient
William Cameron Sproul (1870–1928), Pennsylvania governor
John R. Sweney (1837–1899), gospel music composer
David Trainer (1814–1890), textile manufacturer and banker
Henry Clay Vedder (1853–1935), Baptist church historian
Young Singleton Walter (1811–1888), Pennsylvania State Representative for Delaware County from 1877 to 1880, owner of Delaware County Republican'' newspaper
William Ward (1837–1895), US congressman
William Ward Jr. (1865–1949), Pennsylvania representative and two-term mayor of Chester
Jonathan Edwards Woodbridge (1844–1935), American shipbuilder
William P. Worrall (1827–1887), Pennsylvania State Representative for Delaware County from 1875 to 1876

References

External links
Chester Rural Cemetery website

Further reading
A History of Delaware County, George Ashmead.

1863 establishments in Pennsylvania
American Civil War military monuments and memorials
Cemeteries established in the 1860s
Cemeteries in Delaware County, Pennsylvania
Chester, Pennsylvania
Mass graves
Rural cemeteries
United States national cemeteries